The 2004 Asian Women's Softball Championship was an international softball tournament which featured twelve nations which was held from 12–18 December 2004 at the Rizal Memorial Baseball Stadium in Manila, Philippines. The top three finishing teams qualified for the 2006 Women's Softball World Championship which was held in Beijing, China.

Final ranking

Source:Softball Confederation of Asia

References

Asian Women's Softball Championship
International softball competitions hosted by the Philippines
2004 in Philippine sport